Winnetka Road is an American television drama which premiered on NBC on March 12, 1994, and concluded on April 16, 1994 after six episodes. The series was created by John Byrum, and follows the lives and loves of an oddly interconnected group of people in a suburban Chicago town.

Cast and characters
 Sandy McPeak as Sterling Grace
 Eddie Bracken as Father Burke
 Benjamin Caya as Bratty Boy
 Kristen Cloke as MayBeth Serlin
 Richard Gilliland as Jason Peterson
 Harley Venton as Stanley 'Stan' Oldman
 Ed Begley Jr. as Glenn Barker
 Josh Brolin as Jack Passion
 Kurt Deutsch as Kevin Page
 Catherine Hicks as Jeannie Barker
 Meg Tilly as George Grace
 Paige Turco as Terry Mears
 Megan Ward as Nicole Manning
 Kellen Hathaway as Nicky (Nicholas) Oldman
 Jayne Frazer as Patti
 Richard Herd as Mike

Episodes

External links
 

1994 American television series debuts
1994 American television series endings
1990s American drama television series
Television shows set in Illinois
Television series by Spelling Television
Television series by CBS Studios